Richard Bishop (August 13, 1910 – September 8, 1996) was an American gymnast. He competed in the men's rings event at the 1932 Summer Olympics.

References

1910 births
1996 deaths
American male artistic gymnasts
Olympic gymnasts of the United States
Gymnasts at the 1932 Summer Olympics
People from Syosset, New York